Jane Zhang is an entrepreneur and a Chinese angel investor from Shanghai. She was an early investor of UT Starcom, Alibaba and VIPS.

Education 
Zhang has a BA from Fudan University, a degree from Georgetown University, and an MBA from Harvard University.

Career
In 2015, she found Shellpay and is the chairman of this Chinese blockchain company. Before starting Shellpay, she worked as a Chief Strategy Officer for Circle Pleasure Corporation, CEO of China First Music and CEO of Shanghai Wall Street Strategies Advisors. Their main mission is to solve the existing problems found in the blockchain network while also building a more powerful blockchain platform which is more flexible, safe and adoptable for different applications.

Her company was selected by Dubai Future Accelerator for their 2017 Spring program. They are working with Immigration office to develop Blockchain solutions in Dubai.

References

Living people
Harvard Business School alumni
Businesspeople from Shanghai
Chinese women company founders
Fudan University alumni
Georgetown University alumni
21st-century Chinese businesswomen
21st-century Chinese businesspeople
Year of birth missing (living people)
Chinese technology company founders